Edmund Stubb was a priest and academic at the end of the 15th century and the beginning of the 16th.

Stubb was born in Scottow. He was educated at Gonville Hall, graduating MA in 1478; and B.D. in 1501. He was a Fellow of Gonville from 1480 to 1504; and its Master (and Rector of St Michael Coslany, Norwich) from 1504 until his death in 1514.

References 

Alumni of Gonville Hall, Cambridge
Fellows of Gonville Hall, Cambridge
Masters of Gonville Hall, Cambridge
15th-century English people
16th-century English people
1514 deaths
People from North Norfolk (district)